The Forgotten Arm is the fifth album by singer-songwriter Aimee Mann, with illustrations by artist Owen Smith. It was released by SuperEgo Records on May 3, 2005. It is a concept album, telling the story of two characters who run off with each other to escape their problems, but end up in more trouble than either of them could have imagined. The album reflects Mann's own boxing in its story and illustrations. The title is derived from a move in which one arm is used to hit the opponent, causing him to "forget" about the other arm, which is then used to deliver a harsher blow.

The album won the 2006 Grammy Award for Best Recording Package for Mann and Gail Marowitz (art directors).

Reception

The album so far has a score of 70 out of 100 from Metacritic based on "generally favorable reviews". Prefix Magazine gave the album a score of seven out of ten and said it has "Enough bending guitar licks to satisfy the yuppiest of thirtysomething businessmen and enough mellow ballads to satisfy your Dixie Chicks-loving mom." Trouser Press gave it a positive review and said, "Some of the songs are immediately engrossing... Others mostly carry the story forward while allowing Mann to indulge her career-long taste for vintage keyboard orchestration, coolly elegant pop arrangements and displays of tart wordplay." E! Online gave it a B− and said it "reveals how straight-up dull Mann's country-tinged songs can be." Other reviews are very average, mixed or negative: Mojo gave it three stars out of five and called it "an unfussy affair". Blender gave it two stars out of five and said of Mann, "If she doesn't follow commercial formulas, she's following creative ones, and selling herself short in the process." The A.V. Club gave it an unfavorable review and said, "Mann's signature wordplay sounds clichéd and exhausted, and her melodies lack the energy and pop sparkle that distinguished her pre-Lost In Space work."

Track listing
All songs written by Aimee Mann.

"Dear John" – 3:07
"King of the Jailhouse" – 5:19
"Goodbye Caroline" – 3:53
"Going Through the Motions" – 2:57
"I Can't Get My Head Around It" – 3:37
"She Really Wants You" – 3:26
"Video" – 3:35
"Little Bombs" – 3:49
"That's How I Knew This Story Would Break My Heart" – 4:19
"I Can't Help You Anymore" – 4:52
"I Was Thinking I Could Clean Up for Christmas" – 4:23
"Beautiful" – 3:48

Japanese bonus track
"Who Knows" – 1:00

Personnel
 Aimee Mann – vocals, acoustic guitar, electric guitar
 Jay Bellerose – drums, percussion
 Victor Indrizzo – drums, cowbells, percussion
 Jeff Trott – electric guitar, baritone guitar, mandolin
 Paul Bryan – bass instrument, background vocals
 Jebin Bruni – keyboards
 West End Horns
Also 
 Julian Coryell

Plot
The album details, in a series of vignettes, the story of John, a Vietnam vet and boxer, and his "kind of white trash" girlfriend Caroline, who meet at the Virginia State Fair in the 1970s, where John is boxing an exhibition round. They get the idea that they can escape their problems by running off together and travelling across the United States. However, their relationship begins to fray as John's addiction to alcohol comes to light. In Vegas, John leaves Caroline to try to get help ("Goodbye Caroline") but resists treatment ("I Can't Get My Head Around It") and finally Caroline gives up on trying to help John ("I Can't Help You Anymore"). However, the album's final song indicates that everything works out somehow, although much later. "It's a character study and a relationship study," Mann says.

Bonus track
The Japanese edition of The Forgotten Arm contains a bonus track ("Who Knows"). This minute-long track acts as an epilogue to the story of Caroline & John, with the following lyrics:

He's always pulled through before, but that's no comfort now.
Who knows in a Holy War, what's winning anyhow?
Who knows?
Who knows?
Who knows?
Who knows?
You only hope that someone shows, who knows.

The Forgotten Arm Tour
Released in 2005–2006

Song list
"Dear John"
"Goodbye Caroline"
"Going Through the Motions"
"Humpty Dumpty"
"Save Me"
"Wise Up"
"Video"
"Little Bombs"
"Amateur"
"Driving Sideways"
"She Really Wants You"
"I Can't Get My Head Around It"
"Sugarcoated"
"I Can't Help You Anymore"

Encore
"King of the Jailhouse"
"One"
"That's Just What You Are"
"Pavlov's Bell"
"It's Not"
"Deathly"

References

External links
 

Aimee Mann albums
2005 albums
Concept albums
SuperEgo Records albums
Albums produced by Joe Henry